The Chukchi Sea Shelf or Chukchi Shelf is the westernmost part of the continental shelf of the United States and the easternmost part of the continental shelf of Russia. Within this shelf, the 50-mile Chukchi Corridor acts as a passageway for one of the largest marine mammal migrations in the world.

The main geological features of the Chukchi Shelf are the Hope Basin and the Herald Thrust, a basement uplift cored by Cretaceous thrust faults. The latter is named after Herald Island. Off the northwestern Alaskan coast there is a Jurassic rift basin, the Hannah Trough. To the north of Alaska the Chukchi Shelf extends to form the Chukchi Plateau which protrudes into the Arctic Ocean geological zone.

The Chukchi Shelf is shared between Russia and the United States according to the 1990 USSR–USA Maritime Boundary Agreement.

50-Mile Chukchi Corridor
The Chukchi Corridor is a 50-mile wide strip of ocean offshore of Northwest Alaska that acts as a passageway for one of the largest marine mammal migrations in the world.

Geography
Following the Chukchi Sea coast, the Chukchi Corridor stretches from Point Hope, Alaska to Utqiagvik, Alaska. From winter through early summer, the area is covered in sea ice with recurring openings in the ice that allow wildlife to migrate north from the Bering Sea to areas of the Chukchi or Beaufort seas during spring and early summer

Fauna
The Chukchi Sea coastline serves as an essential corridor for marine mammals like bowhead whales, beluga whales, Pacific walrus, and bearded seals. It is also an important hunting area for indigenous subsistence hunters. This region includes biologically important gray whale feeding and reproduction habitats Many bird species navigate the Chukchi Corridor to migrate to the North Slope for summer breeding

As a region with substantial seafloor productivity, the Chukchi Corridor is an important nursery habitat for forage fish species,  Arctic cod, and Saffron cod. Saffron and Arctic cod are critical to the Arctic marine food web.

Importance
The Chukchi Corridor is an extremely important region for subsistence hunting for the communities of Point Hope, Point Lay, Wainright, and Utqiagvik, Alaska. Studies show that Inupiaq rely extensively on areas in the Chukchi Corridor for hunting throughout the year.

The National Marine Fisheries Service designated areas along the entire Chukchi coast out to 15–30 miles offshore as Essential Fish Habitat (EFH) for saffron cod. In 2001, the U.S. Fish and Wildlife Service designated Ledyard Bay as critical habitat for spectacled eiders.

Currently, part of the corridor is protected from oil and gas activities. On January 27, 2015, President Obama, using his authorities under the Outer Continental Shelf Lands Act, permanently withdrew the waters 3 to 25 miles offshore from future oil and gas leasing activities. This action leaves the valuable waters 25 to 50 miles offshore unprotected.

References

Further reading
A Season of Abundance: Spring and Summer in the Chukchi Corridor

Marine geology
Bodies of water of the Chukchi Sea
Continental shelves of Russia
Bodies of water of Alaska
Continental shelves of North America